Deyan Enev (born 11 August 1960) is a Bulgarian writer and journalist.

Biography 
Deyan Enev was born in 1960  in Sofia. He graduated from Sofia's First English Language School and later completed a degree in Bulgarian Philology at Sofia University "St. Kliment Ohridski". He is married, with two children.

He has worked as a painter, night-shift hospital attendant, teacher, copywriter, and journalist. Presently, he works for the culture and arts section of Sega Daily.

Enev has published seven collections of short stories: "Chetivo za noshten vlak" ("Readings for the Night Train") (1987); "Konsko evangelie" (1992); "Lovec na hora" ("Man Hunter") (1994), winner of the Annual Award for Fiction of "Hristo Botev" Publishing House, translated in Norway (1997); "Klaneto na petela" ("The Slaughtering of the Rooster") (1997); "Ezi-tura" ("Heads or Tails") (2000), National Award for Bulgarian Fiction "Hristo G. Danov" and the Annual Award for Literature of the Bulgarian Writers Union; "Gospodi, pomiluy" ("Kyrie Eleison" (Have Mercy on Us, Oh Lord)") (2004), the Big Award for New Bulgarian prose "Helikon"; and "Vsichki na nosa na gemiyata" ("Everyone on the bow of the boat") (2005).

His first collection of short stories in English, Circus Bulgaria, came out in 2010 (Portobello Books, translated by Kapka Kassabova).

References

Bulgarian writers
Living people
1960 births